Artan may refer to:

Artan (given name)

Surname
Ahmed Ibrahim Artan Somali diplomat, author and politician
Engin Ali Artan (born 1992), Turkish figure skater
Louis Artan (1837–1890), Dutch-Belgian painter and etcher who specialized in seascapes
Ibrahim Artan Ismail, Somali politician

Geography
Artan River, right tributary of the river Crișul Alb in Romania

See also
Artana (disambiguation)
Artane (disambiguation)
Artanes (disambiguation)
Artanis (disambiguation)
Artian